Pooviyoor is a hamlet near Swamithope in the Kanyakumari district of Tamil Nadu, India.

Kanyakumari
Villages in Kanyakumari district